Polo is a city in Ogle County, Illinois, United States. The population was 2,355 at the 2010 census, down from 2,477 in 2000.

History
The community was named after Marco Polo. Polo was incorporated in 1856.

Geography
Polo is located at  (41.986852, -89.577100).

Demographics

As of the census of 2000, there were 2,477 people, 1,007 households, and 654 families residing in the city. The racial makeup of the city was 98.39% White, 0.04% African American, 0.20% Native American, 0.32% Asian, 0.04% Pacific Islander, 0.65% from other races, and 0.36% from two or more races. Hispanic or Latino of any race were 1.57% of the population.

There were 1,007 households, out of which 31.3% had children under the age of 18 living with them, 51.5% were married couples living together, 10.1% had a female householder with no husband present, and 35.0% were non-families. 31.0% of all households were made up of individuals, and 16.0% had someone living alone who was 65 years of age or older. The average household size was 2.40 and the average family size was 3.00.

In the city, the population was spread out, with 25.1% under the age of 18, 7.4% from 18 to 24, 26.8% from 25 to 44, 21.3% from 45 to 64, and 19.5% who were 65 years of age or older. The median age was 40 years. For every 100 females, there were 91.4 males. For every 100 females age 18 and over, there were 87.1 males.

The median income for a household in the city was $38,833, and the median income for a family was $46,250. Males had a median income of $37,857 versus $24,135 for females. The per capita income for the city was $18,604. About 7.2% of families and 9.2% of the population were below the poverty line, including 11.2% of those under age 18 and 10.0% of those age 65 or over.

Education
Polo has its own school district, Polo School District 222, which includes Polo Community High School, Aplington Middle School which grades are through 6th to 8th, and Centennial Elementary School which is Preschool to 5th.

Library
The Polo Public Library at 302 West Mason Street in Polo is operated by the Polo Public Library District. The building is one of several Carnegie libraries on the National Register of Historic Places. The library was established in 1871 as an association which charged a membership fee and was transferred to the town under the new name Buffalo Township Free Public Library in 1891.

Notable people

 George Perkins Clinton (1867–1937), botanist and mycologist
 George Peek, economist
 Kathleen Weaver, writer and editor

See also
 Polo, Missouri, named after Polo, Illinois

References

External links

Polo official website
History of Polo
Polo Community Unit School District 222
Polo Public Library District

 
Cities in Ogle County, Illinois
Cities in Illinois
Rockford metropolitan area, Illinois
1856 establishments in Illinois